was a Japanese engineer and physicist, specializing in the field of semiconductor technology and Nobel Prize laureate, best known for inventing the bright gallium nitride (GaN) p-n junction blue LED in 1989 and subsequently the high-brightness GaN blue LED as well.

For this and other achievements, Akasaki was awarded the Kyoto Prize in Advanced Technology in 2009, and the IEEE Edison Medal in 2011. He was also awarded the 2014 Nobel prize in Physics, together with Hiroshi Amano and Shuji Nakamura, "for the invention of efficient blue light-emitting diodes, which has enabled bright and energy-saving white light sources". In 2021, Akasaki, along with Shuji Nakamura, Nick Holonyak, M. George Craford and Russell D. Dupuis were awarded the Queen Elizabeth Prize for Engineering "for the creation and development of LED lighting, which forms the basis of all solid state lighting technology".

Early life and education

He was born in Chiran, Kagoshima Prefecture and raised in Kagoshima City. His elder brother is  who was an electronic engineering researcher and a Professor Emeritus at Kyushu University. (Their surname "" is also pronounced Akazaki.)

Isamu graduated from Kagoshima Prefectural Daini-Kagoshima Middle School (now Kagoshima Prefectural Konan High School) in 1946, from Seventh Higher School Zoshikan (now Kagoshima University) in 1949 and from  Department of Chemistry, Faculty of Science, Kyoto University in 1952. During his university years, he visited shrines and temples that local residents rarely visit, walked around the mountains of Shinshu during the summer vacation, enjoyed classes and enjoyed a fulfilling student era. After he became a researcher, he obtained the degree of Doctor of Engineering from Nagoya University in 1964.

Research
Akasaki started working on GaN-based blue LEDs in the late 1960s. Step by step, he improved the quality of GaN crystals and device structures at Matsushita Research Institute Tokyo, Inc. (MRIT), where he decided to adopt metalorganic vapor phase epitaxy (MOVPE) as the preferred growth method for GaN.

In 1981 he started afresh the growth of GaN by MOVPE at Nagoya University, and in 1985 he and his group succeeded in growing high-quality GaN on sapphire substrate by pioneering the low-temperature (LT) buffer layer technology.

This high-quality GaN enabled them to discover p-type GaN by doping with magnesium (Mg) and subsequent activation by electron irradiation (1989), to produce the first GaN p-n junction blue/UV LED (1989), and to achieve conductivity control of n-type GaN (1990) and related alloys (1991) by doping with silicon (Si), enabling the use of hetero structures and multiple quantum wells in the design and structure of more efficient p-n junction light emitting structures.

They achieved stimulated emission from the GaN firstly at room temperature in 1990, and developed in 1995 the stimulated emission at 388 nm with pulsed current injection from high-quality AlGaN/GaN/GaInN quantum well device. They verified quantum size effect (1991) and quantum confined Stark effect (1997) in nitride system, and in 2000 showed theoretically the orientation dependence of piezoelectric field and the existence of non-/semi-polar GaN crystals, which have triggered today's worldwide efforts to grow those crystals for application to more efficient light emitters.

Nagoya University Akasaki Institute

Akasaki's patents were produced from these inventions, and the patents have been rewarded as royalties. Nagoya University Akasaki Institute opened on October 20, 2006. The cost of construction of the institute was covered with the patent royalty income to the university, which was also used for a wide range of activities in Nagoya University. The institute consists of an LED gallery to display the history of blue LED research/developments and applications, an office for research collaboration, laboratories for innovative research, and Akasaki's office on the top sixth floor. The institute is situated in the center of the collaboration research zone in Nagoya University Higashiyama campus.

Professional record

Akasaki worked as a Research Scientist from 1952 to 1959 at Kobe Kogyo Corporation (now, Fujitsu Ltd.). In 1959 he was a research associate, assistant professor, and associate professor at the Department of Electronics at Nagoya University until 1964. Later in 1964, he was the Head of Basic Research Laboratory at Matsushita Research Institute Tokyo, Inc. until 1974 to later become a General Manager of Semiconductor Department (in the same institute until 1981). In 1981 he became a professor in the Department of Electronics at Nagoya University until 1992.

From 1987 to 1990 he was a Project Leader of "Research and Development of GaN-based Blue Light–Emitting Diode" sponsored by Japan Science and Technology Agency (JST). He then led the "Research and Development of GaN-based 
Short-Wavelength Semiconductor Laser Diode" product sponsored by JST from 1993 to 1999. While he led this project, he was also a visiting professor at the Research Center for Interface Quantum Electronics at Hokkaido University, from 1995 to 1996. In 1996 he was a Project Leader of the Japan Society for the Promotion of Science's  for the "Future program" up to 2001. From 1996 he started as a Project Leader of "High-Tech Research Center for Nitride Semiconductors" at Meijo University, sponsored by MEXT until 2004. From 2003 up to 2006 he was the Chairman of "R&D Strategic Committee on the Wireless Devices Based on Nitride Semiconductors" sponsored by METI.

He continued working as a Professor Emeritus of Nagoya University, Professor of Meijo University from 1992. He was also the Director of the Research Center for Nitride Semiconductors at Meijo University since 2004. He also worked as a Research Fellow at Akasaki Research Center of Nagoya University from 2001.

Death

Akasaki died of pneumonia, on April 1, 2021, aged 92.

Honors and awards

Scientific and academic

 1989 – Japanese Association for Crystal Growth (JACG) Award
 1991 – Chu-Nichi Culture Prize
 1994 – Technological Contribution Award, Japanese Association for Crystal Growth in commemoration of its 20th anniversary
 1995 – Heinrich Welker Gold Medal, the International Symposium on Compound Semiconductors
 1996 – Engineering Achievement Award, the Institute of Electrical and Electronics Engineers / Lasers Electro-Optics Society
 1998 – Inoue Harushige Award, Japan Science and Technology Agency
 1998 – C&C Prize, the Nippon Electric Company Corporation
 1998 – Laudise Prize, the International Organization for Crystal Growth
 1998 – Jack A. Morton Award, the Institute of Electrical and Electronics Engineers
 1998 – Rank Prize, the Rank Prize Foundation
 1999 – Fellow, the Institute of Electrical and Electronics Engineers
 1999 – Gordon E. Moore Medal for Outstanding Achievement in Solid State Science and Technology, the Electrochemical Society
 1999 – Honoris Causa Doctorate, the University of Montpellier II
 1999 – Toray Science and Technology Prize, Toray Science Foundation
 2001 – Asahi Prize, the Asahi Shinbun Cultural Foundation
 2001 – Honoris Causa Doctorate, Linkoping University
 2002 – Outstanding Achievement Award, the Japan Society of Applied Physics
 2002 – Fujihara Award, the Fujihara Foundation of Science
 2002 – Takeda Award, the Takeda Foundation
 2003 – President's Award, the Science Council of Japan (SCJ)
 2003 – Solid State Devices & Materials (SSDM) Award
 2004 – Tokai TV Culture Prize
 2004 – University Professor, Nagoya University
 2006 – John Bardeen Award, the Minerals, Metals & Materials Society
 2006 – Outstanding Achievement Award, the Japanese Association for Crystal Growth
 2007 – Honorable Lifetime Achievement Award, the 162nd Research Committee on  Wide Bandgap Semiconductor Photonic and Electronic Devices, Japan Society for the Promotion of Science (JSPS)
 2008 – Foreign Associate, the US National Academy of Engineering
 2009 – Kyoto Prize Advanced Technology, the Inamori Foundation
 2010 – Lifetime Professor, Meijo University
 2011 – Edison Medal, the Institute of Electrical and Electronics Engineers
 2011 – Special Award for Intellectual Property Activities, the Japan Science and Technology Agency
 2011 – Minami-Nippon Culture Prize-Honorable Prize
 2014 – Nobel Prize in Physics together with Hiroshi Amano and Shuji Nakamura
 2015 – Charles Stark Draper Prize
 2015 – Asia Game Changer Award
 2016 – UNESCO Medal for contributions to the development of nanoscience and nanotechnologies ceremony
 2021 – Queen Elizabeth Prize for Engineering

National

 1997 – Medal with Purple Ribbon, the Japanese Government
 2002 – Order of the Rising Sun, Gold Rays with Neck Ribbon, the Japanese Government
 2004 – Person of Cultural Merit, the Japanese Government
 2011 – Order of Culture, the Japanese Emperor

See also
 List of Japanese Nobel laureates
 List of Nobel laureates affiliated with Kyoto University

References

Further reading
Insights & Enterprise in PHOTONICS SPECTRA, 54, November 2004
Materials Research Society Symposium Proceedings, Volume 639 (2000), pages xxiii－xxv

External links
Nobel Prize website

Compound Semiconductor (pp. 17–19)
New York Times obituary: “Nobel winner lit up the world with LEDs” (April 2021). 

1929 births
2021 deaths
Japanese nanotechnologists
People from Kagoshima Prefecture
Kyoto University alumni
Academic staff of Nagoya University
Light-emitting diode pioneers
IEEE Edison Medal recipients
Recipients of the Order of Culture
Recipients of the Order of the Rising Sun, 3rd class
Recipients of the Medal of Honor (Japan)
Japanese Nobel laureates
Nobel laureates in Physics
Draper Prize winners
Fellow Members of the IEEE
Members of the Japan Academy
Nagoya University alumni
Kagoshima University alumni
Foreign associates of the National Academy of Engineering
Asia Game Changer Award winners
Deaths from pneumonia in Japan
Kyoto laureates in Advanced Technology